Nitro Park was a baseball park located in Ranger, TX. It was the home of the Ranger Nitros in the West Texas League from 1920 to 1922. The field was also used for high school football. The venue was constructed during the economic boom of the early 1920s.

References

Baseball venues in Texas
High school football venues in Texas
1920 establishments in Texas
1920s establishments in Texas